Elizabeth Anita Reddi is an Indian model and beauty queen. She was first Indian to win Miss Teenage Intercontinental Pageant.

Career and Femina Miss India
She participated in Femina Miss India twice, in 1977 when she was crowned Femina Teen Princess India 1977 and later in 1980 when she was crowned Femina Miss India World 1980.

Femina Miss India 1977
She participated in Femina Miss India 1977 contest and was crowned Femina Teen Princess India 1977 and also won two sub-awards at the pageant including Miss Photogenic and Miss Beautiful Hair. She was chosen to represent India at Miss Teenage Continental 1978 held in Aruba that year.

Miss Teenage Intercontinental 1978
She represented India at the annual Miss Teenage Intercontinental 1978 pageant took place at Aruba Concorde Hotel & Casino, Oranjestad, Aruba and was crowned the eventual winner at the pageant. She also won two sub awards including Miss Amity and Best in National Costume.

Femina Miss India 1980
After completing her reign as Miss Teenage Intercontinental she returned to India and continued with modelling.

Miss World 1980
She represented India at Miss World 1980 and was among the top 15 semifinalists.

References

Living people
Female models from Andhra Pradesh
Indian beauty pageant winners
1963 births
Femina Miss India winners
Miss World 1980 delegates